Oktober is a three-part British television psychological thriller, written and directed by Stephen Gallagher, that first broadcast on ITV on 2 April 1998. Based upon Gallagher's 1988 novel of the same name, the series stars Stephen Tompkinson as Jim Harper, a schoolteacher who finds himself drawn into an international conspiracy when a pharmaceutical company eyeball him to be the human guinea pig in a new, state-of-the-art medical trial.

Tompkinson told the Daily Mirror that he was keen to take on the more active role of Jim Harper, commenting; “I grabbed this project because I’d never been asked to do anything like this before, and the chance to do stunts was one reason it was so appealing. As soon as I read the script I knew there hadn’t been anything like this on British television for a very long time. It has elements of The 39 Steps running through it. It asks how an ordinary person manages to deal with a set of quite extraordinary events.”

The series was released on Region 2 DVD on 24 May 2004. A reprint of Gallagher's novel with Tompkinson on the cover art followed on 2 January 2018.

Production
The series was initially written for the BBC, but after they declined to commission the project, the series was offered to ITV, who chose to commission it the following year. Whilst filming in the Swiss Alps, a number of crew members suffered from altitude sickness, which temporarily halted production.

The series was intended for broadcast in February 1998, with a number of listings magazines including features on the series prior to broadcast; but due to changes in the ITV, the series did not transmit until early April. The series has since been repeated on ITV2.

Cast
 Stephen Tompkinson as Jim Harper 
 Lydzia Englert as Rochelle 
 Maria Lennon as Linda 
 James McCarthy as Viveros 
 James Duke as Daniel 
 Michael Bertenshaw as Dr. Franks 
 Stephen Jenn as Russian 
 Richard Leaf as Bruno 
 Lisa Jacobs as Dr. Bauer 
 Michael N. Harbour as Werner 
 James Kerr as Stephen 
 Tim Poole as Terry 
 Hermione Gulliford as Kim 
 Billy McColl as Billy

Episodes

References

External links

1998 British television series debuts
1998 British television series endings
1990s British drama television series
1990s British television miniseries
ITV television dramas
Television shows based on British novels
English-language television shows
Television shows set in Switzerland